Pasteur - AMIA is a station on Line B of the Buenos Aires Underground. It was opened on 17 October 1930 as part of the inaugural section of the line between Federico Lacroze and Callao.

It is located in the Balvanera barrio, at the intersection of Avenida Corrientes and Calle Pasteur, and named after the latter. In 2015, murals and monuments commemorating the 1994 AMIA bombing (which took place nearby) were set up in the station, while proposals were put forward to change the name of the station to Pasteur - AMIA. This was approved in July 2015, and the station was renamed.

Gallery

References

External links

Buenos Aires Underground stations
Balvanera
Railway stations opened in 1930
1930 establishments in Argentina